Platteville Public Transportation is the public transportation system in Platteville, Wisconsin. It is owned by the city of Platteville and operated by Russ Stratton Buses, Inc. Fixed route bus service began in May 2016, although Platteville had a shared ride taxi as public transport prior.

Services
The transit system operates four routes which run during the academic year at UW-Platteville. During the summer months, only one route is in operation. Service is only provided Monday through Saturday. The routes are as follows:

Black Route: 7am-7pm Monday through Friday year round
Orange Route: 7am-7pm Monday through Friday during the academic year
Purple Route: 2pm-6pm Saturdays during the academic year
Green Route: 7pm-3:30am Friday and Saturday during the academic year

Ridership

See also
 List of bus transit systems in the United States
 List of intercity bus stops in Wisconsin

References

External links
https://www.platteville.org/publicworks/page/transportation

Bus transportation in Wisconsin